The Braconinae are a large subfamily of braconid parasitoid wasps with more than 2,000 described species. Many species, including Bracon brevicornis, have been used in biocontrol programs.

Description and distribution 
Braconines are small to medium sized wasps. Many are dark in color, but they can be red, orange, or pale. They have cyclostome mouthparts and females usually have a long ovipositor.

They are found worldwide, but are most diverse in the Paleotropical region.

Biology 
Braconines are idiobiont ectoparasitoids of concealed larvae. The hosts of most species are Lepidoptera or Coleoptera, with a few attacking Diptera or Symphyta. Usually, they paralyze the host with venom before laying one or more (depending on the species) large eggs on the host's exterior.

Tribes 
 Adeshini
 Aphrastobraconini
 Argamaniini
 Bathyaulacini
 Braconini
 Coeloidini
 Euurobraconini
 Glyptomorphini
 Gnathobraconini
 Physaraiini
 Rhammurini
 Vaepellini

References

External links 
 
 
 
 Photos at BugGuide.net
 DNA barcodes at BOLD Systems

 
Apocrita subfamilies
Taxa named by Christian Gottfried Daniel Nees von Esenbeck